Józef Brandt (1841 in Szczebrzeszyn – 1915 in Radom) was a Polish painter, a representative of the Munich School, best known for his paintings of battles.

Life
Brandt studied in Warsaw in the school of J.N. Leszczynski and at the Noblemen's Institute. In 1858 he left for Paris to study at the Ecole centrale Paris but was persuaded by Juliusz Kossak to abandon engineering in favor of painting.  He studied as a painter in Munich under Franz Adam and Karl Piloty and then opened his own studio.

His paintings mostly study 17th-century military life, though he has also made some studies of Polish peasant life.

In 1893, Brandt was awarded the Order of Isabella the Catholic, and in 1898, he became the recipient of the Bavarian Maximilian Order for Science and Art.

Centre of Polish Sculpture
Brandt's 19th century manor house in Orońsko together with surrounding park serves today as the Centre of Polish Sculpture.

Gallery

See also
List of Polish painters

Notes

References
 
 
 

1841 births
1915 deaths
People from Szczebrzeszyn
People from Lublin Governorate
19th-century Polish painters
19th-century Polish male artists
20th-century Polish painters
20th-century Polish male artists
Polish war artists
Military art
19th-century war artists
19th-century painters of historical subjects
Equine artists
Polish male painters